Prototype is a 1983 television film, starring Christopher Plummer.

Plot synopsis

Just before Christmas, a security guard discovers a top secret project has disappeared from a laboratory. It is an advanced humanoid robot with learning and analytical abilities, developed by a team led by irascible Nobel laureate Dr. Carl Forrester. He has taken the robot – named Michael – out for field testing at a department store then to his own home for dinner to see if the robot can fool his wife, Dorothy. Lab security escort Forrester and Michael back to the lab, to Dorothy’s puzzlement.

Forrester’s associate, Gene Pressman, a scientist with ultra-liberal leanings, is ecstatic about the success of the unscheduled field test but Dr. Jarrett, the administrator of the lab, is furious at Forrester. After a confrontation with Forrester, Jarrett notifies the Pentagon that the prototype is ready for evaluation. After Forrester goes home for the night, military personnel enter the lab and take Michael.

Forrester and Pressman are angry that Jarrett allowed the Pentagon to take Michael. Once he returns, the entire team closely examines Michael to find out what the government did with him. They find that tests included shooting firearms. The pacifistic Forrester and Pressman believe that the military may use expendable robots like Michael as soldiers or even political assassins. General Keating from the Pentagon assures him that isn’t their intent, but Forrester is unconvinced.

At night, Forrester sneaks Michael out in his car after Pressman distracts the guard at the front desk. Forrester and Michael switch to a car Pressman rented and go on the run. When Forrester calls Dorothy from a gas station, she insists he hang up as Keating and other agents are there and trying to trace the call.

Forrester takes Michael to hide at the college campus where he used to teach as a young professor. He rents an off-campus apartment and a garage. Michael interacts with other people on campus as well as learns about self-determination, including reading the fate of the creature in Mary Shelley’s Frankenstein novel. Needing more money, Forrester calls Pressman.

The next afternoon, they return to the apartment but the surroundings are suspicious. Forrester orders Michael to hide in the garage. Inside the apartment, he finds Pressman. Aware that Pressman could not have withdrawn the money after business hours, Forrester accuses him of leading the government to him in exchange for a fully-funded research grant that he had long sought. Pressman denies it, claiming concern for Forrester as his only motivation. Forrester proposes a meeting at a coffee shop if Pressman will lead the agents away as a gesture of trust.

Forrester finds Michael in the garage and is resigned to having to surrender him to the government. Michael decides he wants to be in control of his fate and proposes self-immolation using flammable liquids stored in the garage. Forrester is aghast at the idea but finally agrees that it’s the only way to keep Michael out of the government’s hands. They say good bye and Forrester goes to the coffee shop where he numbly joins Pressman, Jarrett and Keating as fire engines respond to the blaze at the garage.

Cast
 Christopher Plummer as Dr. Carl Forrester
 David Morse as Michael
 Frances Sternhagen as Dorothy Forrester
 James Sutorius as Dr. Gene Pressman
 Stephen Elliott as Dr. Arthur Jarrett
 Doran Clark as Chris
 Alley Mills as Dr. Rebecca Bishop
 Arthur Hill as Gen. Keating
 Ed Call as Security guard
 Jonathan Estrin as Dr. Cooper
 Richard Kuss as Harris
 Pat McNamara as Landlord
 Vahan Moosekian as Dr. Kirk
 Molly Hansen as Elizabeth Hammond Ph.D. (uncredited)

Production

Filmed as a made for TV movie airing on the CBS network.

Reception

The New York Times praised the movie, citing the acting, script and directing as strong points, finding the move "uncommonly riveting "  Creature Feature gave the movie 3.5 out of 5 stars, saying the movie was intelligent, well-acted and praised that both sides of the issue.

References

External links

American science fiction television films
1983 television films
1983 films
1980s science fiction films
Films scored by Billy Goldenberg
1980s American films